Englewood is a former railroad station at Depot Square in Englewood, New Jersey. Once served by the Erie Railroad's Northern Branch, the building is located in the city's town center along the ROW now used as a branch line by CSX Transportation. The station at Depot Plaza (as it was originally known) was one of the original stations upon opening of the Northern Railroad of New Jersey, which included two others in the town, Van Brunts (later Nordhoff) and Highwood (later Hudson Avenue). The building has undergone various incarnations as restaurants, a recording studio, and a performing arts school. The proposed Northern Branch Corridor Project extension the Hudson–Bergen Light Rail would pass the station along the line.

Northern Branch and HBLR
The station was a stop along Erie Railroad's suburban Northern Branch (NRRNJ) which originated/terminated at Pavonia Terminal on the Hudson River in Jersey City. It stopped being used for passenger rail transport in 1966 (by which time trains had been redirected to Hoboken Terminal). Service continued north into Rockland County, New York.

The Northern Branch Corridor Project is a proposed New Jersey Transit (NJT) project to extend the Hudson–Bergen Light Rail along the line providing service newly built stations along the route. The project has stalled due to a lack of funding. The line would pass by the Erie station and terminate at Englewood Hospital and Medical Center. A station stop at Depot Square is the city’s much-preferred alternative to NJT's proposed new Englewood Town Center Station to the south. A third stop, Englewood Route 4, would be located at the intersection of Route 4 and Route 93.

Bennett Studios
The station building was Bennett Studios, a recording studio, from 2001 until 2011. The 6,500-square-foot studio was established by Dae Bennett, the son of Tony Bennett.

The Performing Arts School at BergenPAC
Since 2013 the building houses Bergen Performing Arts Center Performing Arts School. Students have the opportunity to perform on both the theater’s main stage and throughout the county. Programs also outreach to school districts and special needs groups.

See also
Tenafly station, a NRHP-listed station along the line
Demarest station, a NRHP-listed station along the line
Timeline of Jersey City, New Jersey-area railroads
Operating Passenger Railroad Stations Thematic Resource
List of NJ Transit railroad stations

Bibliography

References 

Gothic Revival architecture in New Jersey
Railway stations in the United States opened in 1859
Railway stations in Bergen County, New Jersey
Former Erie Railroad stations
Former railway stations in New Jersey
Englewood, New Jersey
Repurposed railway stations in the United States
1859 establishments in New Jersey